Anilza Pinho de Carvalho, better known by her stage name Anilza Leoni, (October 10, 1933 – August 6, 2009) was a Brazilian actress, singer, former ballerina and painter.

Leoni was born in Laguna, Santa Catarina, Brazil, on October 10, 1933. She died of emphysema in Rio de Janeiro on August 6, 2009, at the age of 75.

Filmography

Television
2008 – Casos e Acasos (series on Rede Globo) … Berta
2008 – Queridos Amigos (miniseries on Rede Globo) … Neusa
2007 – Pé na Jaca! (Globo)… Dalva
2002 – Brava Gente … Marta
2002 – Desejos de Mulher (Globo) … Customer of Selma
1990 – Barriga de Aluguel (Globo) … Edith
1986 – Selva de Pedra (Globo)
1985 – A Gata Comeu (Globo) … Ester Penteado
1984 – A Máfia no Brasil
1965 – Quatro Homens Juntos (Record) … Marlene

References

External links

1933 births
2009 deaths
Brazilian actresses
People from Santa Catarina (state)
Brazilian women artists
Deaths from emphysema
20th-century Brazilian painters
20th-century Brazilian women artists
20th-century Brazilian women singers
20th-century Brazilian singers